Yanko Angelov (born 29 June 1993) is a Bulgarian professional footballer who plays as a midfielder for Etar Veliko Tarnovo.

Career

Septemvri Sofia
Angelov joined Septemvri Sofia in the beginning of July after his previous team - Pirin Razlog, merged with Septemvri. He made his debut for the team in the first round of the season in a match against Spartak Pleven. On 26 November 2016 he scored his debut goal for the team in a league match against Levski Karlovo providing the only goal for the 1:0 win. Angelov scored a goal and helped his team win the Promotion playoffs against elite member Montana on 3 June 2017 with 2:1 final result and qualifying his team in the top level after 19 years.

Lokomotiv Plovdiv
On 10 July 2017, Angelov signed with Lokomotiv Plovdiv.

Montana
On 20 July 2020 he joined Montana after leaving Hebar. This was his second time at the club, after playing there during the 2014/2015 season, helping them win first place in B Group.

Career statistics

Club

Honours

Club
Lokomotiv Plovdiv
 Bulgarian Cup: 2018–19

References

External links

Living people
1993 births
Sportspeople from Pazardzhik
Bulgarian footballers
Bulgaria under-21 international footballers
Association football midfielders
FC Lyubimets players
FC Montana players
FC Pirin Razlog players
FC Septemvri Sofia players
PFC Lokomotiv Plovdiv players
FC Hebar Pazardzhik players
FC Maritsa Plovdiv players
First Professional Football League (Bulgaria) players
Second Professional Football League (Bulgaria) players